Turbary Park is an area of West Howe, Bournemouth in Dorset. Turbary Park is south of Kinson and north of Wallisdown.

Geography 

Turbary Common is the largest area of heathland in North Bournemouth. It is also a Site of Special Scientific Interest. The habitats include scrub, wooded areas and both wet and dry heath.

Facilities 
Turbary Park is served by the Turbary Retail Park. Also in the area is the NHS Turbary Park Medical Centre.

Politics 
Turbary Park is part of the Bournemouth West constituency. Turbary Park is part of the Kinson ward which elects three councillors to Bournemouth, Christchurch and Poole Council.

References 

Areas of Bournemouth
Sites of Special Scientific Interest in Dorset
Heaths of the United Kingdom